CGMP is an initialism. It can refer to:

cyclic guanosine monophosphate (cGMP)
current good manufacturing practice (cGMP)
CGMP, Cisco Group Management Protocol, the Cisco version of Internet Group Management Protocol snooping
caseinoglycomacropeptide (CGMP) or caseinomacropeptide; see K-casein
Competitive guaranteed maximum price